Elizabeth Sarah McLaughlin is an American actress. She is known for playing Massie Block in The Clique and Valerie McAllister in the ABC television drama Betrayal. She recently played Alicia Hopkins in the Amazon Studios television series Hand of God.

Life and career
McLaughlin was born in Morgantown, West Virginia. When she was three, her family moved to the town of Zephyrhills, Florida.

She began her acting career with community theater groups in Tampa, Florida. At the age of eight she joined the apprentice cast of Entertainment Revue, a professional show choir in Tampa, and was promoted to the professional cast two years later. She has made presentations including singing for Florida Governor Jeb Bush and California Governor Arnold Schwarzenegger.

McLaughlin has been a member of SAG-AFTRA's Los Angeles Local Board of Directors since 2013, running under the Unite for Strength slate.

Filmography

References

External links

 

Year of birth missing (living people)
Living people
21st-century American actresses
Actresses from West Virginia
American child actresses
American film actresses
American television actresses
People from Morgantown, West Virginia